Lidiya Maksimenko (born ) is an Azerbaijani female former volleyball player, playing as an outside-spiker. She was part of the Azerbaijan women's national volleyball team.

She competed at the 2009 Women's European Volleyball Championship. At club level she played for Azərreyl Baku.

References

External links
cev.lu
fivb.org

1981 births
Living people
Azerbaijani women's volleyball players
Place of birth missing (living people)
Outside hitters
21st-century Azerbaijani women